Jean Fayard (1902 in Paris – 1978) was a French writer and journalist, winner of the Prix Goncourt in 1931.

Fayard was also director of the Editions Fayard.
Jean Fayard was the grandson of the founder of Fayard. 
At the death of his father, Joseph Artheme Fayard, 1936, he took the helm of the publishing family.
His papers are held at Institut Mémoires de l'édition contemporaine, 25, 7th arrondissement of Paris.

Work
 Deux ans à Oxford? Impr. F. Paillart, 1924
 Dans le monde où l'on s'abuse, Arthème Fayard, 1925
 Journal d'un colonel, Éditions de la nouvelle revue française, 1925
 Trois quarts de monde: roman, Artheme Fayard, 1926
 Oxford et Margaret, A. Fayard, 1928
 Madeleine et Madeleine, Gallimard, 1928
 Bruxelles, Émile-Paul frères, 1928
 Mal d'amour, Éditions de l'imprimerie nationale, 1931
 Liebesleid: Roman, R. Piper, 1933
 La féérie de la rue: roman, Henri Duvernois, Jean Fayard, B. Grasset, 1937
 Mes Maitresses, A. Fayard, 1941
 Roman, A. Fayard, 1945
 L'Allemagne sous le Croix de Lorraine, "Les Oeuvres Libras", 1945
 La guerre intérieure, Stock, 1974, 
 Je m'éloigne: roman, Plon, 1977,

English Translations
 Oxford & Margaret: Translated from the French by Louis Golding, Jarrolds, 1925
 Desire, Translated by Warre Bradley Wells, The Century Co., 1932

References

External links
Bruxelles / par Jean Fayard

1902 births
1978 deaths
Writers from Paris
Prix Goncourt winners
20th-century French novelists
French male novelists
20th-century French male writers